Yahweh ben Yahweh (born Hulon Mitchell Jr.; October 27, 1935 – May 7, 2007) was an American religious leader, Black separatist and founder of the Nation of Yahweh, a new religious movement headquartered in Florida that had thousands of Black American devotees at its peak. He preached that Jesus is Black and that "white devils" temporarily rule over Black people. He was accused of teaching hate. Yahweh was indicted on three counts of federal racketeering and extortion charges, of which he was found not guilty. However, he was convicted of conspiracy to commit murder.

Early life
Yahweh ben Yahweh was born Hulon Mitchell Jr. on October 27, 1935. One of 15 children born to Hulon Mitchell Sr., the minister of the Antioch Church of God in Christ in Enid, Oklahoma, and Pearl O. Mitchell (nee Leatherman), pianist for the same congregation.

After leaving Oklahoma, Mitchell joined the military and then attended law school. He moved to Atlanta, where in the 1960s he joined the Nation of Islam (NOI) and took the name Hulon X. After leaving the NOI in the late 1960s, he became a faith healing Christian preacher and named himself Father Mitchell, fashioning himself after Father Divine and Samuel "Father Jehovia" Morris, two African-American ministers and self-proclaimed divine connections to God who were active during the early 20th century. Mitchell arrived in Miami, Florida in 1978, where he gathered members of the city's Black Hebrew Israelite congregations and founded the Nation of Yahweh.

Leader of the Nation of Yahweh

The Nation of Yahweh set up its headquarters in Liberty City, Florida in 1979. 

Broadly classified as a branch of the Black Hebrew Israelite movement, Mitchell's doctrine emphasized the belief that God and all of the prophets of the Bible were black and that blacks would gain the knowledge of their true history through Mitchell. He also characterized whites and Jews as infidels and oppressors. Mitchell emphasized loyalty to himself as the son of God.

Mitchell's business and charity efforts earned him respect in the community. Then-Miami mayor Xavier Suárez declared Yahweh ben Yahweh Day on October 7, 1990, a month before Ben Yahweh's indictment.

Crimes and aftermath
Although Yahweh ben Yahweh's followers remained devoted to him, he was in trouble with the law by the 1990s. Between 1990 and 2001, he served eleven years of an eighteen-year sentence on a Racketeer Influenced and Corrupt Organizations Act (RICO) conviction after he and several other Nation of Yahweh members were convicted of conspiracy for the role of ex-followers in more than a dozen murders. Robert Rozier, a former NFL player and a devotee of Mitchell, confessed to seven of these murders.

Ben Yahweh faced conviction only for conspiracy to murder. A primary component of the prosecution's case was Rozier, who testified in return for a lighter sentence. Rozier later entered the Witness Protection Program, but returned to prison on a sentence of 25 years to life under California's three strikes law, following a check kiting conviction. Mitchell had the Federal Bureau of Prisons ID# 22031-034.

Ben Yahweh was released on parole in 2001 and returned to Miami, but his activities were restricted until a few months before his death. He was prohibited from reconnecting with his old congregation. 

To ensure this, he was restricted from any form of speech by Internet, telephone, computer, radio or television that could place him in contact with any Nation of Yahweh members.

Last years and death
In 2006, as he became increasingly ill with prostate cancer, Jayne Weintraub, ben Yahweh’s attorney, petitioned the U.S. District Court for his release from parole to permit him to "die with dignity".

Mitchell died on May 7, 2007 at the age of 71. The location was not disclosed. "Yahweh will be remembered and mourned by the millions of people that he touched through prayer and teachings", his lawyers, Jayne Weintraub and Steven Potolsky, said in a joint statement.

Television 
The story of the police investigation and prosecution of Yahweh ben Yahweh is the subject of an episode of The FBI Files titled "Temple of Fear" (Season 3, Episode 10) as well as an Investigation Discovery Channel episode of Most Infamous (Season 2, Episode1).

Family
One of Mitchell's siblings is Leona Mitchell, his younger sister,   soprano who sang at the Metropolitan Opera.

See also
 Robert Rozier, murderer associated with Yahweh ben Yahweh's organization
 Black Hebrew Israelites
 Zebra murders
 List of messiah claimants
 List of people claimed to be Jesus
 Messiah complex
 Black supremacy

References

External links
Official website of Yahweh Ben Yahweh and Nation of Yahweh
Article at TruTV's Crime Library
Profile at Apologetics Index
Profile at Religious Movements

1935 births
2007 deaths
People from Kingfisher, Oklahoma
African and Black nationalists
American people convicted of murder
Black supremacists
Black Hebrew Israelite religious leaders
Cult leaders
Former Pentecostals
Deaths from prostate cancer
Self-declared messiahs
Members of the clergy convicted of murder
Deaths from cancer in Florida
People convicted of murder by the United States federal government
American prisoners sentenced to life imprisonment
Prisoners sentenced to life imprisonment by California
American members of the clergy convicted of crimes
Former Nation of Islam members
20th-century American clergy
20th-century African-American people
21st-century African-American people
Founders of new religious movements
Deified people